Epicorsia cerata is a moth in the family Crambidae. It is found on the Lesser Antilles and Cuba.

The larvae have been recorded feeding on Grevillea robusta.

References

Moths described in 1795
Pyraustinae